AICPA Issues Papers new article content ...

List of issues papers
The following list of AICPA Issues Papers have been compiled using the holdings of the University of Mississippi Libraries and the 2008 Technical Practice Aids section entitled "Issues papers of the Accounting Standards Division."  Issues Papers were originally intended to be an evenhanded discussion of topics that needed to be "addressed or clarified by the Financial Accounting Standards Board." Issues Papers were the vehicle the AICPA's Accounting Standards Executive Committee (AcSEC) used to present emerging practice problems to the FASB and accounting practitioners. Issues Papers generally followed a standard format: (1) background, (2) analysis of current practice, (3) review of the literature, (4) statement of issues needing resolution, and (5) advisory conclusions.

While Issues Papers were never enforceable standards, they became recognized (prior to the creation of the FASB Codification in 2009) as the fifth or lowest level in the Generally Accepted Accounting Principles (United States) (GAAP) hierarchy of standards  Issues Papers often offered guidance in areas too narrow for FASB's attention or when guidance was required in a more timely fashion than permitted by the formulation and issuance of a FASB statement. Issues Papers then gained a level of authority as practitioners followed their guidance and different agencies accepted their recommendations.  The U.S. Securities and Exchange Commission (SEC) declared the 1984 Issues Paper, "Identification and Discussion of Certain financial Accounting and Reporting Issues Concerning LIFO Inventories," as authoritative in 1985.  The method of handling stock transaction in the 1980 Issues Paper, Accounting in Consolidation for Issuances of a Subsidiary Stock, was also accepted in 1983 by the SEC as acceptable practice. The 1986 Issues Paper, Accounting for Options, provided the "first definitive professional opinion on how to account for options.

References

External links
 American Institute of Certified Public Accountants

Auditing standards
Accounting in the United States